, or Ars Camera , Arusu Kamera), was one of the older and longer running of Japanese camera magazines.  It was published by the company Ars.

History and profile
The first issue of Ars Camera is dated April 1921: predating Asahi Camera by five years. With a mixture of photographs, material about cameras, and contests, it set a pattern for mainstream camera magazines that has continued to the present day. It managed to keep publishing despite the Tokyo earthquake of 1923, but from January 1941 was forced to merge with Shashin Salon , Shashin Saron) and Camera Club (Kamera Kurabu) to form Shashin Bunka.

Camera was quick to reemerge after the war, with an issue dated January 1946. For some years it was edited by Kineo Kuwabara. Its last issue was dated August 1956.

Notes

References
 Shirayama Mari. "Nihon no shashin/kamera zasshi". Nihon shashin-shi gaisetsu ("An outline history of photography in Japan"). Tokyo: Iwanami, 1999. . P. 38.
 Shirayama Mari. Shashin zasshi no kiseki ("Traces of camera magazines"). Tokyo: JCII Library, 2001. . P. 5. 
 Shirayama Mari. "Major Photography Magazines". In The History of Japanese Photography, ed. Ann Wilkes Tucker, et al. New Haven: Yale University Press, 2003. . Pp. 378–85. P. 378.

External links
"Ars Camera" at Camerapedia.

1921 establishments in Japan
1956 disestablishments in Japan
Magazines established in 1921
Magazines disestablished in 1956
Defunct magazines published in Japan
Monthly magazines published in Japan
Photography magazines published in Japan